Cheung Shan, also known as Middle Hill, is a mountain in Hong Kong at  in height. Located to the north of Kowloon Peak (Fei Ngo Shan) and to the south of Tung Shan, it falls within the Ma On Shan Country Park and straddles the border between Wong Tai Sin and Sai Kung districts.

Landscape

See also 
 Fei Ngo Shan Road
 List of mountains, peaks and hills in Hong Kong
 Tate's Cairn

References 

Sai Kung District
Wong Tai Sin District